Isabelle Mireille Mambingo Mambingo (born 10 April 1985) is a Cameroonian footballer who plays as a goalkeeper for AS Green City and the Cameroon women's national team.

Club career
Mambingo played for Nigerian Women Premier League club Sunshine Queens FC.

International career
Mambingo played for Cameroon at senior level in the 2015 African Games.

References

External links 
 

1991 births
Living people
Cameroonian women's footballers
Women's association football goalkeepers
Sunshine Queens F.C. players
Cameroon women's international footballers
2019 FIFA Women's World Cup players
African Games silver medalists for Cameroon
African Games medalists in football
Competitors at the 2015 African Games
Cameroonian expatriate women's footballers
Cameroonian expatriate sportspeople in Nigeria
Expatriate footballers in Nigeria Women Premier League
21st-century Cameroonian women
20th-century Cameroonian women